Grundaskóli is one of two schools in the port town of Akranes, on the west coast of Iceland, established in 1981. The other school is Brekkubæjarskóli.

External links
 Grundaskóli

Schools in Iceland
Educational institutions established in 1995
1995 establishments in Iceland